Himalphalangium is a genus of harvestmen in the family Phalangiidae.

Species
 Himalphalangium dolpoense Martens, 1973
 Himalphalangium nepalensis (Suzuki, 1970)
 Himalphalangium palpalis (Roewer, 1956)
 Himalphalangium suzukii Martens, 1973
 Himalphalangium unistriatum Martens, 1973

References

Harvestmen
Harvestman genera